Princess Tarakanova (c. 1745 – ) was a pretender to the Russian throne. She styled herself, among other names, Knyazhna Yelizaveta Vladimirskaya (Princess Elizabeth of Vladimir),  Fräulein Frank, and Madame Trémouille. Tarakanova (tarakan is the Russian word for cockroach) is a later name, used only in entertainment (literature, theater, films, paintings), apparently on the basis of how she lived her last months and died. In her own time, she was not known by that name.

Life 
Tarakanova claimed to be the daughter of Alexei Razumovsky and Empress Elizabeth of Russia, reared in Saint Petersburg. Even her place of birth, however, is not certain, and her real name is not known. She is known to have traveled to several cities in Western Europe, and to have become a mistress of Count Philipp Ferdinand of Limburg Stirum, apparently in the hope that he would marry her.

She eventually was arrested in Livorno, Tuscany by Alexei Grigoryevich Orlov, who had been sent by Empress Catherine II to retrieve her. Orlov seduced her, then lured her aboard a Russian ship and took her to Russia in February 1775. She was imprisoned in the Peter and Paul Fortress, where she died of tuberculosis that December. She was buried in the graveyard of the fortress.

A popular theory postulated that her death was faked and that she was secretly forced to take the veil under the name Dosifea. The mysterious nun of this name is recorded as having lived in the Ivanovsky Convent from 1785 until her death in 1810.

Films 
 A play written by Ippolit Shpazhinsky was the basis for the 1910 Russian film Princess Tarakanova.
 A 1930 French film Tarakanova in which she is played by Édith Jéhanne.
 A 1938 French-Italian film Princess Tarakanova with Annie Vernay as Princess Tarakanova and Pierre Richard-Willm as Count Orlov.
 In 1950, a joint UK/Italian movie titled Shadow of the Eagle (Italian-language version The Rival of the Empress) was produced about the seduction mission by Alexei Orlov of Princess Tarakanova, with Valentina Cortese portraying Tarakanova and Richard Greene in the role of Count Orlov. In this story, Tarakanova is portrayed as a real princess who is a threat to Catherine the Great both politically and in royal lineage, not a pretender to the throne of Russia. The story portrays Orlov as a betrayer of Catherine the Great, in that he allies himself with Tarakanova while claiming false allegiance to Catherine. The events in the film follow history authentically until the meeting of Princess Tarakanova and Orlov takes place, and the ending alters actual real-life events, in that Orlov rescues Tarakanova from prison in Russia in a daring raid and they live happily ever after.
 In 1990, an award-winning Soviet film production titled The Royal Hunt was released, directed by Vitaly Melnikov, based on a play by Leonid Zorin of the same title. It told the story of the life and adventures around Europe of Princess Tarakanova and the operation by Alexei Orlov to trick and capture her.
 She appears in Ekaterina TV series in Season 3: Impostors, portrayed by Angelina Strechina.

References

Sources
 Simon Sebag Montefiore, The Romanovs 1613–1918

External links 

 

1745 births
Tarakanova, Princess
Tarakanova
Tarakanova, Princess
Russian people who died in prison custody
Tuberculosis deaths in Russia
Prisoners who died in Russian detention
18th-century people from the Russian Empire
Prisoners of the Peter and Paul Fortress